Eric Martinsson (born October 22, 1992) is a Swedish professional ice hockey defenceman who is currently playing for HV71 of the Swedish Hockey League (SHL).

Playing career
Martinsson originally played as a youth with Rögle BK in the SuperElit before spending one North American junior season with the Des Moines Buccaneers of the United States Hockey League (USHL) in the 2012–13 season.

After he was passed over in the 2013 NHL Entry Draft, Martinsson opted to return to Sweden to make his debut with Rögle BK in the Allsvenskan in the 2013–14 season. He featured in 19 games for 3 assists, before breaking out offensively in the postseason qualifiers with 14 points in 16 games.

With Rögle BK confined to the second tier Allsvenskan, Martinsson signed an initial two-year contract with the Växjö Lakers of the Swedish Hockey League (SHL) on April 15, 2014. Martinsson made his SHL debut playing with Lakers during the 2014–15 SHL season, and won a Le Mat Trophy.

After helping the Växjö Lakers to a second Swedish championship in the 2017–18 season, Martinsson as a free agent, agreed to terms on a one-year, two-way contract with the Minnesota Wild of the National Hockey League (NHL) on May 2, 2018. After attending the Wild's training camp, Martinsson was assigned to begin the 2018–19 season, with American Hockey League affiliate, the Iowa Wild. Martinsson produced 9 assists in 13 games before opting to mutually terminate his contract with the Wild, after being placed on unconditional waivers on November 28, 2018.

On November 28, 2018, Martinsson joined Swiss club, Genève-Servette HC of the National League (NL) for the remainder of the season on a one-year deal worth CHF 500,000. He was brought to the team as a replacement for injured Johan Fransson. On January 6, 2019, Martinsson was hit from behind, falling head first into the boards, by Marc Wieser in a game against HC Davos. Martinsson left the game and went straight to the hospital in Davos, where he spent the night, before returning to Geneva the next day. He suffered a severe concussion which sidelined him for the next two months. Whereas Wieser was only fined CHF 5,100 and suspended for three games. Martinsson returned to Geneva's lineup with 10 games remaining in the regular season and was a healthy scratch for games 3 and 4 of the 2019 Quarterfinals against SC Bern. Martinsson displayed poor performances following his return and was not offered a contract extension by Geneva, making him a free agent.

On April 17, 2019, Martinsson returned to Sweden, agreeing to a three-year contract with HV71 of the SHL.

Career statistics

Awards and honors

References

External links
 

1992 births
Barys Nur-Sultan players
Des Moines Buccaneers players
Genève-Servette HC players
HV71 players
Iowa Wild players
Living people
Rögle BK players
Swedish ice hockey defencemen
Växjö Lakers players